Redington may refer to:

People
Amanda Redington (born 1962), British actress and TV presenter
Bernice Orpha Redington (1891–1966), American home economics expert and journalist
Daryll Reddington (born 1972), former New Zealand cricketer
Frank Redington (1906–1984), English actuary
Helen Reddington (AKA Helen McCookerybook; born c. 1950), English rock performer and author
Ian Reddington (born 1957), English actor
James Redington (1872–1962), Irish politician, Mayor of Galway 1959–1960
Joe Redington (1917–1999), American dog musher and kennel owner
Stuart Reddington (born 1978), English footballer
Thomas Nicholas Redington (1815–1862), Irish politician and civil servant
Tony Reddin (1919–2015), Irish former sportsperson born Martin Charles Reddington

Places
Redington, Arizona
Reddington, Indiana
Redington, Nebraska
Redington Beach, Florida
Redington Shores, Florida
Redington Museum, historic museum in Waterville, Maine
Redington Pass, Arizona
Mount Redington, a mountain in Franklin County, Maine

See also
 
Reddington (disambiguation)
Reding (disambiguation)
Redding (disambiguation)
Reddin
Redden (disambiguation)
Reading (disambiguation)